Travis Tritt is an American country music artist. His discography comprises 13 studio albums (counting a Christmas album), six compilation albums, and 43 singles. Of his studio albums, the highest-certified is 1991's It's All About to Change, at 3× Platinum certification by the RIAA and platinum certification by the CRIA. His first, third, and fourth albums—Country Club, T-R-O-U-B-L-E and Ten Feet Tall and Bulletproof, respectively—are all certified double platinum in the US, while 1996's The Restless Kind, 2000's Down the Road I Go and his 1995 Greatest Hits: From the Beginning album are all certified platinum. It's All About to Change is also his highest-peaking album on Billboard Top Country Albums, at #2.

Of Tritt's forty-three singles, all but two charted on Billboard Hot Country Songs. This total includes five Number Ones on that chart: "Help Me Hold On" (1990), "Anymore" (1991), "Can I Trust You with My Heart" (1993), "Foolish Pride" (1994), and "Best of Intentions" (2000). "Best of Intentions" is also his highest peak on the Billboard Hot 100 at #27, while its follow-ups ("It's a Great Day to Be Alive" and "Love of a Woman", both of which went to #2 on the country chart) reached #33 and #39 on the Hot 100. He has also charted three album cuts that entered the lower regions of the country chart based on unsolicited airplay.

Tritt has also been featured as a guest on eight singles, including two releases by his friend Marty Stuart: "This One's Gonna Hurt You (For a Long, Long Time)" and "Honky Tonkin's What I Do Best", from 1992 and 1996. He has also sung guest vocals on singles for Patty Loveless, Charlie Daniels, Mark O'Connor, and comedian Bill Engvall.

Studio albums

1980s and 1990s

2000s

Live albums

Compilation albums

Singles

1980s and 1990s

2000s-2020s

As a featured artist

Charted B-sides

Music videos

Notes

References

Country music discographies
Discographies of American artists